Wishes (Chinese: 许愿泡泡茶) is a Singaporean kids drama produced by MediaCorp Channel 8. it was broadcast every Sunday at 10.00am.

Plot
6 kids are schoolmates that faced different problems either at home or school. They came across a bubble tea shop and saw 
a uncle who runs the shop and told them that this isn't an ordinary bubble tea shop. He makes special and magical bubble tea and they must make a wish before drinking but do they believe him or is it just a joke?

References

Trivia
Bonnie Loo  appears in an advertisement in looking for young actors just like Tan Jun Sheng and Lyn Oh to appear in this new drama.
It succeeds drama Three Little Wishes

See also
List of MediaCorp Channel 8 Chinese drama series (2010s)

Singaporean drama television series